Bloody Christmas is a 2012 American slasher film directed by Michael Shershenovich, starring Steve Montague, Robert Youngren and Geretta Geretta.

Cast
 Steve Montague as Rich Tague
 Robert Youngren as Father Michael
 Geretta Geretta as Gaylen
 Robert Arensen as Detective Steinman
 Lloyd Kaufman as Pastor Paul

Reception
Ryan Covey of CHUD.com rated the film 2.5 stars out of 5, writing that "It’s padded out, slow, badly acted, and the film and sound quality are not great." The Black Saint of HorrorNews.net rated the film 1.5 "shrouds" out of 5, writing that "It’s definitely bad yet it’s sickeningy watchable at the same time." Jesse Skeen of DVD Talk wrote a negative review of the film, writing that it is "mostly a throwaway production, with very little to please most horror fans."

References

External links
 
 

American slasher films
2010s slasher films